Śrāvaṇa is the fifth month of the Hindu calendar. In India's national civil calendar, Śrāvaṇa is the fifth month of the year, beginning on July 23 and ending on August 22. In the Tamil calendar, it is known as Āvani and is the fifth month of the solar year. In lunar religious calendars, Śrāvaṇa begins on the new moon (according to the amanta tradition) or the full moon (according to the purnimanta tradition) and is the fifth month of the year. Srabon (also spelt Sravan) is the fourth month of the solar Bengali calendar. It is also the fourth month of the Nepali calendar. Śrāvaṇa is also the second month of Varsha (the rainy season).

The month of Shravana is very important for the entire Indian subcontinent, as it is connected to the arrival of the south-west monsoons. For many Hindus, the month of Shraavana is a month of fasting. Many Hindus will fast every Monday to the Lord Shiva and/or every Tuesday to the Lady Parvati. Fasting on Tuesdays of this month is known locally as "Mangala Gauri Vrat".

Festivals
Shravana is considered to be a holy month in the Hindu calendar due to the numerous festivals that are celebrated during this time. Also, special worship of Lord Shiva and fasting is observed on Mondays.

Dashamaa Vart
Dashamaa Vart is dedicated to Lady Dashamaa and is observed on the first day of Shraavana as per Gujarati tradition.

Krishna Janmashtami

Krishna Janmashtami marks the birth of Lord Sri Krishna on the eighth day after the full moon, which is the 23rd day of Shravana according to the amanta tradition, and is celebrated with great pomp by Hindus across the world, especially those of the Vaishnava traditions.

Raksha Bandhan

Raksha Bandhan also called Rakhi Purnima or simply Rakhi in many parts of India and Nepal, is a Hindu religious festival. The festival signifies and celebrates the bond between brothers and sisters. It is celebrated on Shraavana Poornima (Full Moon). In simple words, Raksha bandhan means "Bond of Protection"

Naryal Poornima

In western India and parts of Maharashtra, Gujarat, and Goa, Shraavana Poornima (full moon) day is celebrated as Narali Purnima. On this day, an offering of a coconut ( in Gujarati,  in Marathi) is made to the sea, as a mark of respect to Lord Varuna, the God of the Sea. In the coastal regions of Maharashtra i.e. Konkan, a coconut is offered to the sea for calming it down after the monsoon season. Narali Purnima is the beginning of the fishing season, and the fishermen, who depend on the sea for a living, make an offering to Lord Varuna so that they can reap bountiful fish from the sea. Fishermen start fishing in the sea after this ceremony.

Nag Panchami

Nag Panchami is also celebrated in many parts of India on the fifth day after Amavasya of Shraavana month. The snake god Nāga is worshiped. The last day of Shraavana is celebrated as Pola, where the bull is worshiped by farmers from Maharashtra.

Basava Panchami
In Karnataka Basava Panchami is celebrated on the fifth day after amavasya. In 1196 AD, on this day, Lingayat dharma guru Basava merged with God.

Avani Avittam
In southern and central parts of India including Maharashtra , Goa, Kerala, Andhra Pradesh, Tamil Nadu, Karnataka and Odisha, Shraavana Poornima day is when many communities perform the rituals of Avani Avittam or Upakarma.

Shri Baladeva birthday
Shraavana Poornima day is also celebrated as Shri Baladeva's birth ceremony. Lord Krishna's elder brother Prabhu Balarama was born on this Poornima.

Gamha Purnima
Gamha Purnima is celebrated in Odisha. On this date, all the domesticated cows and bullocks are decorated and worshipped. Various kinds of country-made cakes called pitha and sweets, mitha, are made and distributed within families, relatives and friends. In Oriya Jagannath culture, the Lord Krishna and Lady Radha enjoy the rainy season of Shravana starting from Shukla Pakhya Ekadashi (usually four days before Purnima) and ending on Rakhi Purnima with a festival called Jhulan Yatra. Idols of Radha-Krishna are beautifully decorated on a swing called Jhulan, hence the name Jhulan Yatra.

Kajari Purnima
In central parts of India such as Madhya Pradesh, Chhattisgarh and Jharkhand Shraavana Poornima day is celebrated as Kajari Purnima. It is an important day for farmers and women blessed with a son. On the ninth day after Shravana Amavasya, the preparations of the Kajari festival start. This ninth day is called Kajari Navami and varied rituals are performed by women who have sons until Kajri Purnima or the full moon day.

Pavitropana
In parts of Gujarat, Shraavana Poornima day is celebrated as Pavitropana. On this holiday, people perform the grand pooja or the worship of Lord Shiva. It is the culmination of the prayers done throughout the year.

Pavitra Ekadashi
On Ekadashi Day [11th day], Vaishnavas in Gujarat and Rajasthan celebrate it as the birth of Pushtimarga, the path of grace. On this day, Lord Krishna appeared in front of Shri Vallabhacharya. Shri Vallabhacharya offered him a thread (soothan), which was pious (pavitra). Since that day every year, Pavitra Ekadashi is celebrated. Such threads are offered from Ekadashi till Raksha Bandhan.

Jandhyam Poornima
Jandhyam is Sanskrit for 'sacred thread', and Poornima denotes the full moon in Sanskrit. Jandhyala Purnima is observed on the full moon day (Poornima) in the month of Shraavan in Andhra Pradesh. Brahmins perform the sacred thread changing ceremony on this day and it is also known as Yajurveda Nutanasahitha Upakarma.

Salono
In Haryana and Punjab, in addition to celebrating Raksha Bandhan, people observe the festival of Salono. Salono is celebrated by priests solemnly tying amulets on people's wrists for protection against evil The day is dedicated to local saints involving devotees receiving such amulets. In Haryana, the festival of Salono also involves sisters tying threads on brothers to ward off evil. Despite the two festivals being similar in their practices, Salono and Raksha Bandhan are distinct observances with the threads tied for Salono being called ponchis.

Pola

Pola is a festival respecting bulls and oxen which is celebrated by farmers in Maharashtra. Pola is a thanksgiving festival of farmers and their families for their bulls. It is celebrated in Maharashtra to acknowledge the importance of bulls and oxen, who are a crucial part of agriculture and farming activities. It falls on the last day or the new moon day of Shraavana.

Shravani Mela

Shravani Mela is a major festival time at Deoghar in Jharkhand with thousands of saffron-clad pilgrims bringing holy water around 100 km on foot from the Ganges at Sultanganj, Bihar. Shravan is also the time of the annual Kanwar Yatra, the annual pilgrimage of devotees of Shiva, known as Kanwaria make to Hindu pilgrimage places of Haridwar, Gaumukh and Gangotri in Uttarakhand to fetch holy waters of Ganges River

Hindu saint Sri Guru Raghavendra Swami, who advocated Sri Madhvacharya's Dvaita philosophy, achieved Videha Mukti on Sraavana Bahula Dwitiya in 1671 AD .

In popular culture
Being the period when the monsoon falls over the heated plains of India, the season is celebrated in various texts, such as the Sanskrit text Meghaduta by Kalidasa. Many films too have been made with Sawan in their title, like Aya Sawan Jhoom Ke, (1969), Sawan Bhadon (1970), Solva Sawan (1979), Sawan Ko Aane Do (1979), Pyaasa Sawan (1980), etc.

Also, in Hindustani classical music, many songs are themed around Radha and Krishna during the rainy season, and also Bollywood songs, e.g., Sawan ki Ritu Aai, Sawan ka Mahina Pawan kare Sor''' and 'Rim jhim gire Saawan'.''

During Shraavana, the Hindu community in the regions of Goa, Maharashtra and Karnataka practice a vegetarian diet. This is because during the monsoon season, it is difficult to get seafood; it is thought that most fish spawn during this period and abstaining from fishing in Shraavana will lead to increased fish throughout the year.

See also

 Astronomical basis of the Hindu calendar
Hindu calendar
 Hindu units of measurement
 Hindu astronomy
 Jyotish
 Vassa, a similar festival in Buddhism also observed with meditation

References

External links
1.Sawan somvar Vrat katha

05